Moore Hall may refer to:

in England
Moore Hall, Cheshire

in Ireland
Moore Hall, Co. Mayo, the ancestral home of the Moore family in Carra, County Mayo, Ireland

in the United States
Moore Hall (Kansas State University), a dormitory, in Manhattan, Kansas
Moore Hall (Phoenixville, Pennsylvania), listed on the National Register of Historic Places in eastern Chester County, Pennsylvania

Architectural disambiguation pages